is a Japanese actor from Tokyo. He has appeared in many Japanese television dramas and movies; most notable is the TV series Water Boys. He also appeared in Summer Time Machine Blues and Tokyo Friends: The Movie.

Career
In 2009, Eita was cast in his first theatrical role playing a human in a romantic relationship with a female ghost. Not long after in August 2009, it was announced that Eita had been cast as the lead in the play Tokyo Gekko Makyoku, playing a mysterious character living in the early Shōwa era. It was his first time playing the lead in a theatrical production.

Personal life
On June 1, 2010, it was announced that Eita would marry singer Kaela Kimura, who was already five months pregnant, that summer after becoming engaged in late 2009. Eita and Kimura announced that they submitted their marriage registration on September 1, 2010.

Filmography

Film

TV Dramas

Japanese dub

Music video

Awards

References

External links
 

1982 births
Living people
Japanese film actors
Japanese stage actors
Japanese television actors
Male actors from Tokyo
21st-century Japanese male actors